Keith Fagnou (June 27, 1971 – November 11, 2009) was a Canadian organic chemist and studied education and was a professor of chemistry at University of Saskatchewan and associate professor of organic chemistry at the University of Ottawa.  His research focused on developing new reactions that avoid unnecessary activation of substrates and that can instead directly functionalize C–H bonds of simple molecules and introduce C–C bonds.

Biography

Dr. Keith Fagnou was born on June 27, 1971 in Saskatoon, Saskatchewan.  Fagnou, a former naval reserve officer, pursued studies at the University of Saskatchewan and received a Bachelor of Education (B.Ed.) in 1995.  After teaching at the high school level for a short period, he continued his studies in chemistry at the University of Toronto in 1998 under the supervision of Mark Lautens. In 2000 he received his M.Sc. degree, and in 2002 his Ph.D.  Professor Lautens said that Keith "was exceptionally bright and exceptionally down-to-earth and was the most productive person, in the history of his research group."   After his PhD, he joined the faculty at the University of Ottawa as an assistant professor and in 2007 was promoted to associate professor with tenure and awarded a University of Ottawa Research Chair in the Development of Novel Catalytic Transformations.

While at the University of Ottawa, he established a research program primarily devoted to the development of novel "direct arylation" reactions which allow for the rapid synthesis of important building blocks in medicinal chemistry.  Of note, the development of direct arylation of benzene and pyridine N-oxide.  Members of his research group are sometimes referred to as "The Fagnou Factory".  His contributions in the field were rewarded with numerous awards and have been included in reviews published on the subject.

Dr. Keith Fagnou died of complications resulting from a H1N1 influenza infection on November 11, 2009 at the age of 38.

The University of Ottawa established the "Keith Fagnou Scholarship in Science" in his memory.  The members of his research group also organized a symposium (KFOS) in his honour which was held May 5–7, 2010.  The Pacifichem chemistry conference also held a memorial symposium titled "C-H Functionalization, Memorial Symposium for Professor Keith Fagnou".  In 2011, Keith was recognized as the #77 chemist in the world over the period 2000-2010 on the basis of citations per paper, according to Thomson-Reuters' Sciencewatch.com.

Awards 

Rutherford Memorial Medal (2009)
OMCOS Award (2009)
Sloan Research Fellowship (2008)
Merck Process Award (2008)
Eli Lilly Grantee (2007–2009)
NSERC Discovery Accelerator Supplement Award (2007–2009)
Amgen Young Investigator's Award (2007)
Astra Zeneca Award for Chemistry (2007)
University of Ottawa Research Chair in Novel Catalytic Transformations (2007–2012)
Merck Process Research Award (2007)
University of Ottawa Young Researcher of the Year (2006)
Ichikizaki Travel Grant Award (2006)
Boehringer Ingelheim Young Investigator Award in Organic Chemistry (2005)
Cottrell Scholar Award (2005)
Ichikizaki Travel Grant Award (2005)
Premier's Research Excellence Award (2003)
John C. Polanyi Award in Chemistry (2003)

References

External links 
Fagnou Research Group
H1N1 suspected in death of U of O professor

1971 births
2009 deaths
Organic chemists
Canadian chemists
Scientists from Saskatchewan
People from Saskatoon
University of Saskatchewan alumni
Academic staff of the University of Ottawa
University of Toronto alumni
20th-century Canadian scientists
21st-century Canadian scientists